The year 2015 is the 5th year in the history of the ONE Championship, a mixed martial arts promotion based in Singapore.

Tournament bracket

Guangzhou Featherweight Tournament

ONE Guangzhou Featherweight Tournament bracket

Guangzhou Flyweight Tournament

ONE Guangzhou Flyweight Tournament bracket

Myanmar Lightweight Tournament

ONE Myanmar Lightweight Tournament bracket

Myanmar Featherweight Tournament

ONE Myanmar Featherweight Tournament bracket

Beijing Featherweight Tournament

ONE Beijing Featherweight Tournament bracket

List of events

ONE Championship: Age of Champions

ONE Championship: Age of Champions (also known as ONE Championship 25) was a mixed martial arts event held by ONE Championship. The event took place on March 13, 2015 at the Putra Indoor Stadium in Kuala Lumpur, Malaysia.

Background

ONE Championship returned to Malaysia, with this event headlined by Adriano Moraes who made his first ONE Flyweight Championship title defense.

Results

ONE Championship: Valor of Champions

ONE Championship: Valor of Champions (also known as ONE Championship 26) was a mixed martial arts event held by ONE Championship. The event was held on April 24, 2015 at the Mall of Asia Arena in Pasay, Philippines.

Background

ONE Championship returned to Philippines with this event headlined by Ben Askren, who made his first ONE Welterweight Championship title defense.

Results

ONE Championship: Warrior's Quest

ONE Championship: Warrior's Quest (also known as ONE Championship 27) was a mixed martial arts event held by ONE Championship. The event was held on May 22, 2015 at the Singapore Indoor Stadium in Kallang, Singapore.

Background

ONE Championship returned to Singapore with this event headlined by two title fights.

The featherweight bout between Rob Lisita and Timofey Nastyukhin was cancelled after Lisita failed a medical.

Results

ONE Championship: Dynasty of Champions (Guangzhou)

ONE Championship: Dynasty of Champions (Guangzhou) (also known as ONE Championship 28) was a mixed martial arts event held by ONE Championship. The event was held on June 20, 2015 at the Guangzhou Tianhe Gymnasium in Guangzhou, China.

Background

ONE Championship made its second visit to China after the December 2014 event at Beijing.

Results

ONE Championship: Kingdom of Warriors

ONE Championship: Kingdom of Warriors (also known as ONE Championship 29) was a mixed martial arts event held by ONE Championship. The event was held on July 18, 2015 at the Thuwunna National Indoor Stadium in Yangon, Myanmar.

Background

ONE Championship made its debut in Myanmar holding the third title defense for ONE Bantamweight champion Bibiano Fernandes and the first Lethwei fight in the history of the promotion under traditional rules, knockout only to win.

Results

ONE Championship: Dynasty of Champions (Shanghai) (Cancelled)

ONE Championship: Dynasty of Champions (Shanghai) was canceled. The event was going to be held on September 17, 2015 at the Mercedes-Benz Arena in Shanghai, China.

Background

ONE Championship makes its third event in China holding the first title defense for ONE Middleweight champion Igor Svirid. Initially scheduled for September 1, the event was officially cancelled due to public holidays in China. Some of the fights were rescheduled to the Jakarta Odyssey of Champions card.

Cancelled fight card

ONE Championship: Odyssey of Champions

ONE Championship: Odyssey of Champions (also known as ONE Championship 30) was a mixed martial arts event held by ONE Championship. The event was held on September 27, 2015 at the Istora Senayan in Jakarta, Indonesia.

Background

ONE Championship returns to Indonesia holding some fights of the cancelled Dynasty of Champions (Shanghai) card which were rescheduled. Initially this event was going to feature the first title defense for Featherweight Champion Jadamba Narantungalag, but it was cancelled due to visa issues. Marat Gafurov fought Martin Nguyen for the interim Featherweight Championship.

Results

ONE Championship: Tigers of Asia

ONE Championship: Tigers of Asia (also known as ONE Championship 31) was a mixed martial arts event held by ONE Championship. The event was held on October 9, 2015 at the Putra Indoor Stadium in Kuala Lumpur, Malaysia.

Background

ONE Championship returns to Malaysia holding the first title defense for Middleweight Champion Igor Svirid. Several fights initially scheduled for the Shanghai event were also rescheduled for this card.

Results

ONE Championship: Pride of Lions

ONE Championship: Pride of Lions (also known as ONE Championship 32) was a mixed martial arts event held by ONE Championship.  The event was held on November 13, 2015 at the Singapore Indoor Stadium in Kallang, Singapore.

Background

ONE Championship returned to Singapore with the proposed long-awaited rematch between Ben Askren and Luis Santos for the ONE Welterweight Championship, together with the first title defense for Strawweight Champion Dejdamrong Sor Amnuaysirichoke.

Luis Santos ended up missing weight by 2 lb during the weight ins. Askren offered to fight Santos if he weighed in under 190 pounds by the next morning, but Santos refused.  Ultimately the fight was cancelled.

Yago Bryan also missed weight, but Dejdamrong Sor Amnuaysirichoke agreed to fight a catchweight bout in a non-title fight.

Results

ONE Championship: Dynasty of Champions (Beijing II)

ONE Championship: Dynasty of Champions (Beijing II) (also known as ONE Championship 33) was a mixed martial arts event held by ONE Championship. The event was held on November 21, 2015 at the Olympic Sports Center Gymnasium in Beijing, China.

Background

ONE Championship returns to China holding two title bouts, the unification for the ONE Featherweight Championship between Current Champion Jadamba Narantungalag and Interim Champion Marat Gafurov, and the second title defense for ONE Flyweight Champion Adriano Moraes.

Results

ONE Championship: Kingdom of Khmer

ONE Championship: Kingdom of Khmer (also known as ONE Championship 34) was a mixed martial arts event held by ONE Championship. The event was held on December 5, 2015 at the Koh Pich Theatre in Phnom Penh, Cambodia.

Background

ONE Championship returns to Cambodia presenting more exciting fights for the local crowd.

Results

ONE Championship: Spirit of Champions

ONE Championship: Spirit of Champions (also known as ONE Championship 35) was a mixed martial arts event held by ONE Championship. The event was on December 11, 2015 at the Mall of Asia Arena in Pasay, Philippines.

Background

ONE Championship returns to the Philippines holding the inaugural contest for the ONE Heavyweight Championship between UFC veteran Brandon Vera and Paul Cheng. Vera was supposed to fight against Chi Lewis-Perry but the latter failed to submit his medical and drug test records.

Yang Jian Bing was supposed to fight fellow Flyweight Geje Eustaquio but he failed to cut weight and was rushed to a nearby hospital due to dehydration and possible heat stroke. Bing was later announced dead on the fight day itself.

Results

See also
 2015 in UFC 
 Bellator MMA in 2015
 2015 in Rizin Fighting Federation 
 2015 in Absolute Championship Berkut 
 2015 in Road FC 
 2015 in Kunlun Fight

References

External links
ONE Championship

ONE Championship events
ONE Championship events
2015 in mixed martial arts
2015 in kickboxing
2015-related lists